The tiger grunter (Amniataba affinis) is a freshwater species of ray-finned fish within the family Terapontidae. The species inhabits rivers in Papea New Guinea, mainly the Fly, Morehead and Bensbach River systems, and can grow to a length of 15 centimeters.

Habitat & biology 
Tiger grunter adults live a demersal lifestyle in tropical swampy lagoons, backwaters and main channels of turbid rivers. Eggs are guarded by males through the use of fanning.

Conservation 
The tiger grunter faces threats such as commercial development, fishing, invasive species (Such as tilapia, snakeheads, rusa deer and common water hycinth), droughts, fires, mining and pollution. Its current population is unknown and is likely declining from the threats it faces. Backwater environments are less likely affected from surrounding pollution compared to mainstream rivers. No current conservation efforts have been made so far, although its range in the Bensbach River overlaps with the Tonda Wildlife Management protected area. The tiger grunter has been classified as 'Least concern' by the IUCN Red List, and more research is requirred to fully determine its current population and impact from threats.

References 

Fish described in 1977
Freshwater fish of Papua New Guinea
Fish of Papua New Guinea
Least concern biota of Oceania
IUCN Red List least concern species
Terapontidae